is one of the official 29 grappling techniques of Kodokan Judo. It is one of the nine joint techniques of the Kansetsu-waza list, one of the three grappling lists in Judo's Katame-waza enumerating 29 grappling techniques.

Technique Description 
Photo
from
http://www.chez.com/judopassion/pages/technique/techn%20sol/kansetsu.htm

Similar Techniques, Variants, and Aliases 
IJF Official Names:
Ude-hishigi-te-gatame(腕挫手固)
U.H. te-gatame
Te-gatame(手固)
TGT

Variants:
Ude-garami-henka-waza(腕緘変化技)
Examples of contest this finished
Tel Aviv Grand Prix 2020  U60kg Semi-Final 
Loss Dai Aoki(Japan) (01:35 Te-gatame) Kim Won-jin(South Korea) Win　IJF movie
Kami-hiza-gatame(上膝固)
Yoko-hiza-gatame(横膝固)
Pillow armlock(V2 armlock)
Telephone armlock
Shoulder arm breaker

Alias: 
Hand armlock

Included Systems 
Systems:
Kodokan Judo, Judo Lists
Lists:
Judo technique
The video, The Essence of Judo featuring Kyuzo Mifune
Ude-Garami(4th pattern)(腕緘 その四)

Technique History

References

External links
Judo Techniques
Judo Lists

Judo technique